In complex geometry, the Kähler identities are a collection of identities between operators on a Kähler manifold relating the Dolbeault operators and their adjoints, contraction and wedge operators of the Kähler form, and the Laplacians of the Kähler metric. The Kähler identities combine with results of Hodge theory to produce a number of relations on de Rham and Dolbeault cohomology of compact Kähler manifolds, such as the Lefschetz hyperplane theorem, the hard Lefschetz theorem, the Hodge-Riemann bilinear relations, and the Hodge index theorem. They are also, again combined with Hodge theory, important in proving fundamental analytical results on Kähler manifolds, such as the -lemma, the Nakano inequalities, and the Kodaira vanishing theorem.

History 
The Kähler identities were first proven by W. V. D. Hodge, appearing in his book on harmonic integrals in 1941.

The operators 
The construction of these operators is standard in the literature on complex differential geometry. In the following the bold letters in brackets indicates which structures are needed to define the operator.

Differential operators 
The following operators are differential operators and arise out of the smooth and complex structure of :
, the exterior derivative. (S)
 , the -Dolbeault operator. (C)
 , the -Dolbeault operator. (C)

The Dolbeault operators are related directly to the exterior derivative by the formula .

Some sources make use of the following operator to phrase the Kähler identities.
 . (C)

It is also useful for the property that . It can be defined in terms of the complex structure  by the formula

Tensorial operators 
The following operators are tensorial in nature, that is they are operators which only depend on the value of the complex differential form at a point. In particular they can each be defined as operators between vector spaces of forms  at each point  individually. 
, the complex conjugate operator. (C)
 , the Lefschetz operator defined by  where  is the Kähler form. (CR)
 , the Hodge star operator. (R)

The direct sum decomposition of the complex differential forms into those of bidegree (p,q) manifests a number of projection operators.
 , the projection onto the part of degree k. (S)
 , the projection onto the part of bidegree (p,q). (C)
 , known as the counting operator. (S)
 , the complex structure operator on the complex vector space . (C)

Adjoints 
These adjoints may be defined either through integration by parts or by explicit formulas using the Hodge star operator .

where  is the inner product on the exterior products of the cotangent space of  induced by the Riemannian metric. Using this -inner product, formal adjoints of any of the above operators (denoted by ) can be defined by the formula

In particular one obtains the following formal adjoint operators of the above differential and tensorial operators. Included is the explicit formulae for these adjoints in terms of the Hodge star operator .
(SR)
(CR)
(CR)
(CR)
(CR)

Laplacians 

 , otherwise known as the Laplace–de Rham operator. (SR)
 . (CR)
 . (CR)
Each of the above Laplacians are self-adjoint operators.

Real and complex operators 
Even if the complex structure (C) is necessary to define the operators above, they may nevertheless be applied to real differential forms . When the resulting form also has real coefficients, the operator is said to be a real operator. This can be further characterised in two ways: If the complex conjugate of the operator is itself, or if the operator commutes with the almost-complex structure  acting on complex differential forms. The composition of two real operators is real.

The complex conjugate of the above operators are as follows:
 .
 .
 .
 .
 .

The identities 

The Kähler identities are a list of commutator relationships between the above operators. Explicitly we denote by  the operator in  obtained through composition of the above operators in various degrees. 

The Kähler identities are essentially local identities on the Kähler manifold, and hold even in the non-compact case. Since the Kähler identities are first order identities in the Kähler metric, the corresponding commutator relations on  imply the Kähler identities locally on any Kähler manifold. 

When the Kähler manifold is compact the identities can be combined with Hodge theory to conclude many results about the cohomology of the manifold.

The above Kähler identities can be upgraded in the case where the differential operators  are paired with a Chern connection on a holomorphic vector bundle . The formal adjoints may be defined similarly to above using an -inner product where the Hermitian metric is combined with the inner product on forms. In this case all the Kähler identities, sometimes called the Nakano identities, hold without change, except for the following:
 .
 .
 .
 , known as the Bochner–Kodaira–Nakano identity.

Primitive cohomology and representation of sl(2,C) 
In addition to the commutation relations contained in the Kähler identities, some of the above operators satisfy other interesting commutation relations. Then one can show the following commutation relations:
 .
 .
 .
In particular when the Kähler manifold is compact, by applying the Hodge decomposition the triple of operators  descend to give an sl2-triple on the de Rham cohomology of X. 

When  is compact, it is a consequence of Hodge theory that the cohomology groups  are finite-dimensional. Any such irreducible representation comes with a primitive element, which is an element  such that .

Hard Lefschetz decomposition
The representation theory of  describes completely an irreducible representation in terms of its primitive element. This defines a finite-dimensional vector space which has an -action induced from the triple . Applying this simultaneously to each primitive cohomology group, the splitting of cohomology  into its irreducible representations becomes known as the hard Lefschetz decomposition of the compact Kähler manifold.

By the Kähler identities paired with a holomorphic vector bundle, in the case where the holomorphic bundle is flat the Hodge decomposition extends to the twisted de Rham cohomology groups  and the Dolbeault cohomology groups . The triple  still acts as an sl2-triple on the bundle-valued cohomology, and the a version of the Hard Lefschetz decomposition holds in this case.

Nakano inequalities 
The Nakano inequalities are a pair of inequalities associated to inner products of harmonic differential forms with the curvature of a Chern connection on a holomorphic vector bundle over a compact Kähler manifold. In particular let  be a Hermitian holomorphic vector bundle over a compact Kähler manifold , and let  denote the curvature of the associated Chern connection. The Nakano inequalities state that if  is harmonic, that is, then
 , and
 .
These inequalities may be proven by applying the Kähler identities coupled to a holomorphic vector bundle as described above. Applying the Nakano inequalities in this case proves the Kodaira–Nakano vanishing theorem for compact Kähler manifolds.

Notes

References 

Complex manifolds
Differential geometry